The 1982–83 Missouri Tigers men's basketball team represented the University of Missouri as a member of the Big Eight Conference during the 1982–83 NCAA men's basketball season. Led by head coach Norm Stewart, the Tigers won the Big Eight regular season title, reached the second round of the NCAA tournament, and finished with an overall record of 26–8 (12–2 Big Eight).

Roster
Steve Stipanovich, Sr.
Jon Sundvold, Sr.
Head Coach: Norm Stewart

Schedule and results

 
|-
!colspan=9 style=| Regular season

|-
!colspan=9 style=| Big Eight Conference tournament

|-
!colspan=9 style=| NCAA tournament

Rankings

Awards
Steve Stipanovich – co-Big Eight Player of the Year

References

Missouri
Missouri
Missouri Tigers men's basketball seasons